Nelson Quan (born October 14, 1984, Houston, Texas, USA) is a Chinese-American film editor, director and producer. His most recent work as an editor for the Volkswagen People's Car Project won the project the Golden Lion Award at the 2013 Cannes Film Festival for Branded Entertainment.  He is known for editing the Chinese remake, What Women Want (2011) and produced The Criminally Inept (2006) along with being one of the first students at the University of Hawaii at Manoa's Academy for Creative Media.

Born and raised in Houston, Texas, and raised by two Chinese parents. He attended the University of Hawaii, Mānoa's Academy for Creative Media and attained a B.A. in Film and TV Producing. 

Under the mentor and direction of former Tri-Star President of Production, Chris Lee, Nelson joined with three other interns to have an all-expense-paid internship on the set of Superman Returns (2006), directed by Bryan Singer. 

After the internship, Nelson worked alongside director Ryan Ishii to produce his own feature The Criminally Inept (2006). Later after Nelson graduated from college, he went on to pursue learning Mandarin and moved to Beijing in the spring of 2008 and studied for two years. After studying, through the introduction of Chris Lee again, Nelson met up with director Daming Chen (Director: "Manhole", "One Foot Off the Ground", "What Women Want").

Nelson helped Daming in many projects, including revising scripts and providing technical help with computer equipment. Nelson then was awarded the editor position for National Wildlife Federation and Xing Xing Digital Entertainment's Wild Animal Baby Explorers where he edited animations and lead the post-production team. 

In the summer of 2010, Daming asked Nelson to be his editor for the Chinese remake of What Women Want.

Filmography
Feature Films
Feb 2011: Bona Films - 《我知女人心》 (TRT: 114 min) - Editor
July 2005: Kolokolo Pictures – The Criminally Inept (TRT: 72 min) – Producer / Editor / First AD

TV Shows
Jun 2010: National Wildlife Federation and Xing Xing Digital Entertainment - Wild Animal Baby Explorers - Editor / Post-Production Supervisor

Short Films
Jun 2011: 48 Hour Film Contest - Red Room (TRT 7 min) - Director—Winner of the 2011 48 Hour Film Contest's Beijing Audience Award.
Jan 2011: Kolokolo Pictures - Killer of Thieves (TRT: 5 min) - Director
Dec 2004: Kolokolo Pictures – Melting Ice (TRT: 10 min) – Producer / Writer / Director
Dec 2004: Kolokolo Pictures – I Got 99 Problems But Beg Bugs Ain't One (TRT: 45 min) – Producer / Writer / Director
Sept 2004: Kolokolo Pictures – Hopeless in Honolulu (TRT: 23 min) – Producer / Editor / Cinematography
May 2004: ACM - Hawaiian Star (TRT: 25 min) – Producer / Director / Writer
Jan 2004: Kaupalama's Possession (TRT: 13 min) – Producer / Director / Editor / Co-Writer
Dec 2001: Chosen Few (TRT: 3 min) – Director/Choreographer/Editor

Documentary
Feb 2011: Contra/MINI - R60 Countryman China Release: Behind the Scenes (TRT: 5 min) - Director
Jun 2008: Kolokolo Pictures - Split Spine (TRT: 12 min) - Producer / Director
Apr 2004: ACM - Humble Beginnings: Derrick Low (TRT: 11 min) – Producer / Director
Mar 2004: ACM - Hawaiian Dream Documentary (TRT: 12 min) – Co-Editor

Music Videos
Apr 2008: Kolokolo Pictures - 《北京欢迎你》Parody Music Video - Director
Jan 2008: Soundfile Productions - "Stay Strong" by: Harrold Perrineau - Assist. Editor
Jun 2007: Kolokolo Pictures - "Don't Know Why" by: Kamuela Kahoano - Director / Cinematography
Mar 2004: ACM - Hawaiian Dream: "Car Wash" (TRT: 70 sec) – Producer / Director

Commercials
May 2013: People's Car Project, The Making of an Original - Editor 
May 2011: Lamiu in Maldives - Cinematographer / Editor
Apr 2011: Volkswagen: "People's Car Project" TV Commercial in China - Editor
Aug 2009: Apple, Inc.: "Mac Quicktips" in Beijing, China - Co-Editor

References

External links

1984 births
Living people
American film editors